Johannes Jacobus van Gastel (5 January 1887 – 5 March 1969) was an archer from the Netherlands. He was born in Tilburg and died in Tilburg.

He represented his native country at the 1920 Summer Olympics in Antwerp, Belgium. There he won the gold medal in the Men's Team Event (28 m), alongside Joep Packbiers, Piet de Brouwer, Driekske van Bussel, Janus van Merrienboer, Tiest van Gestel, Janus Theeuwes, and Theo Willems.

He is the son of Johannes van Gastel, who competed in the 1900 Summer Olympics, also as an archer.

References

External links
 profile

1887 births
1969 deaths
Dutch male archers
Archers at the 1920 Summer Olympics
Olympic archers of the Netherlands
Olympic gold medalists for the Netherlands
Sportspeople from Tilburg
Olympic medalists in archery
Medalists at the 1920 Summer Olympics